Stanislav Kašpárek (born 11 June 1996) is a Czech handball player for Dinamo București and the Czech national team.

He participated at the 2018 European Men's Handball Championship.

References

External links

1996 births
Living people
Sportspeople from Přerov
Czech male handball players
Expatriate handball players
Czech expatriate sportspeople in Hungary
Czech expatriate sportspeople in Belarus
Czech expatriate sportspeople in Romania
SC Pick Szeged players
CS Dinamo București (men's handball) players